Operation Hermann was a German anti-partisan action in the Naliboki forest area carried out between 13 July 1943 and 11 August 1943. The German battle groups destroyed settlements in the area. During the operation, German troops burned down over 60 Polish and Belarusian villages and murdered 4280 civilians. Between 21,000 and 25,000 people were sent to forced labour in the Third Reich. 

A Home Army unit led by Kacper Miłaszewski lost 120 men and was forced out of the forest.
The Bielski partisans, based in the Naliboki forest, managed to evade capture and escaped to the Jasinowo forest after splitting into small groups. 

Following the operation, the communities around the Naliboki forest were devastated, the Germans deported the non-Jewish residents fit for work to Germany for slave labor and murdered most of the rest. Prior to the manhunt, homeless refugees were mainly Jews who had escaped the ghetto, but in the fall of 1943 non-Jewish Belorussian, Polish, and Gypsies who managed to flee roamed in the forest. Many joined partisan units, special family camps set up by the Soviets, and some joined the Bielski group who returned to the area and accepted anyone willing to join. While the Germans wrecked many communities, much was left behind in and around the forest that could sustain life. Fields, orchards, and beehives all had their produce and farm animals roamed the area around the forest.

References 

Hermann
Hermann
Hermann
Hermann
Reichskommissariat Ostland